Jeffrey Praed Broadbent (born in 1944) is a Professor in the Department of Sociology at the University of Minnesota whose academic focus includes comparative sociology; culture and structure; environmental sociology; Japanese society; networks and identity; political sociology; qualitative methods; social movements; and East Asian society. He is also a member of the Institute for Global Studies at the University of Minnesota.

Biography
Broadbent received his B.A. in religious studies-Buddhism at the University of California, Berkeley, his M.A. in regional studies—Japan at Harvard University, and his Ph.D. in sociology at Harvard University.

Broadbent is the principal investigator for the COMPON Project (Comparing Climate Change Policy Networks), an ongoing international research project, focusing on societal reactions to climate change and the ways that these reactions influence international negotiations and governmental policy.

From 1988-1989, Broadbent was a grantee of the Japan-United States Educational Commission (a Fulbright Program), and he was a Fulbright-Hays scholar from 1989-1990. In 2001, Broadbent was awarded the Masayoshi Ohira Memorial Prize for his book, Environmental Politics in Japan: Networks of Power and Protest (Cambridge University Press, 1998).

Bibliography
 Movement in Context: Thick Social Networks and Environmental Campaigns in Japan. Broadbent, Jeffrey, Mario Diani and Doug McAdam, editors. Social Movements and Networks. Relational Approaches to Collective Action, Oxford University Press, 2003.
 Japan’s Environmental Regime: the Political Dynamics of Change. Broadbent, Jeffrey, In Uday Desai (editor), Environmental Politics and Policies in the Industrialized Countries, Cambridge: MIT Press, 2002.
 Environmental Politics in Japan: Networks of Power and Protest. Cambridge University Press, 1998. 
 The Influence Broker State: Exchange Networks and Political Organization in Japan. Broadbent, Jeffrey, Yoshito Ishio, 1998.
 Comparing Policy Networks: Labor Politics in the U.S., Germany, and Japan. Broadbent, Jeffrey, David Knoke; Franz Pappi; Yutaka Tsujinaka, Cambridge University Press, 1996. 
 East Asian Social Movements: Power, Protest and Change in a Dynamic Region. Editors Jeffrey Broadbent and Vicky Brockman. New York: Springer, 2011.

References

University of Minnesota faculty
Living people
Asian studies
1944 births
American sociologists
Environmental sociologists
Harvard Graduate School of Arts and Sciences alumni
UC Berkeley College of Letters and Science alumni